2011 Egypt Cup Final, was the final match of 2010–11 Egypt Cup, when Zamalek played ENPPI at Cairo Stadium in Cairo.

ENPPIwon the game 2–1, claiming the cup for the 2nd time.

Route to the final

Game description

Match details

References

2011
Cup Final
EC 2011
EC 2011